The 2013 Saginaw Sting season was the fifth season for the Continental Indoor Football League (CIFL) franchise.

The Sting's first move in its quest for a title defense in 2013 happened when they re-signed Head Coach Fred Townsend to a 3-year contract extension.

Roster

Schedule

Regular season

Standings

Postseason

Coaching staff

References

2013 Continental Indoor Football League season
Saginaw Sting
Saginaw Sting